List of puddings may refer to:

 List of savoury puddings
 List of sweet puddings